Gostwick is a surname. Notable people with the surname include:

Gostwick Baronets
John Gostwick ( 1480–1545), English courtier, administrator, and MP
William Gostwick (disambiguation), multiple people